Nurocyon is an extinct member of the dog family (Canidae) from the Pliocene of Mongolia. Nurocyon chonokhariensis is the only species in the genus.  The teeth of Nurocyon show adaptations to an omnivorous diet, comparable to the living raccoon dog (Nyctereutes procyonoides). The overall structure of the skull and dentition of Nurocyon are intermediate between the living genus Canis (dogs, wolves, and jackals) and the more primitive Eucyon.

References

Canini (tribe)
Prehistoric canines
Pliocene carnivorans
Pliocene mammals of Asia
Prehistoric monotypic mammal genera
Fossil taxa described in 2006
Prehistoric carnivoran genera